Paenisporosarcina is a bacteria genus from the family of Planococcaceae.

References

Bacillales
Bacteria genera